Thalassianthus aster is a species of sea anemone in the family Thalassianthidae. It dwells in a number of habitats, even existing symbiotically on top of other motile invertebrates such as hermit crabs in a relationship similar to the pom pom crab. Its nematocysts contain a Type-II Na+-channel toxin known as δ-TLTX-Ta1a according to the currently developing systematic nomenclature for peptide and protein toxins from sea anemones.

References

Animals described in 1828
Thalassianthidae